Michael Nakoneczny (born 1952) is an American artist. He lived in Chicago for over twenty years. He is currently teaching painting at the University of Alaska in Fairbanks, Alaska. Michael has received numerous awards including a Rasmuson Foundation Grant, Illinois Art Council Fellowship and an Arts Midwest/NEA Regional Fellowship. He received a BFA from Cleveland State University and an MFA from the University of Cincinnati. Michael Nakoneczny is represented by Zolla/Lieberman Gallery, Inc., Chicago, IL. and Grover Thurston Gallery in Seattle, WA.

Biography 
Michael grew up in Detroit, he received his from MFA University of Cincinnati, BFA Cleveland State University, and later moved to Chicago.
Michael Nakoneczny was a professor at the University of Alaska in Fairbanks until 2015.

Selected exhibitions 

2014     On the House, Wood Constructions and drawings, Zolla/Lieberman Gallery, Chicago, IL
2013     Expo Chicago, International Exposition of Contemporary Art, Chicago, IL
2013     Art Miami, International Art Exhibition, Miami, FL
2011     House Hold Works, Zolla/Lieberman Gallery, Chicago, IL
2008	  Geeks on the Road, Zolla/Lieberman Gallery, Chicago, IL
2008	  Common Thread, Rockford Art Museum, Rockford, IL
2007	  Drawings from Thailand and Cambodia, University of Alaska, Fairbanks, AK
2007     Kat Koh Kong Gallery, Koh Kong, Cambodia
2005	  Lead free Jesus Grover Thurston Gallery, Seattle, WA
2004     South Bend Regional Museum of Art, South Bend, IN
2004 	  A Sharp Eye: An Art Dealer’s 40 Year Journey, Evanston Art Center, IL
2003     Paintings from the icebox, Zolla/Lieberman Gallery, Chicago, IL
2001	  Chicago to Fairbanks, Zolla/Lieberman Gallery, Chicago, IL
2004 	  XXX All Alaska Juried Art Exhibition, Anchorage Museum of History and Art,
2003 	  25th Anniversary Show, Purdue University Gallery, West Lafayette, IN
2001 	  Chicago to Fairbanks, Zolla/Lieberman Gallery, Chicago, IL
2001 	  New Faces: New Work, Anchorage Museum of History and Art, Anchorage, AK*
2001 	  Snowglobe Invitational, Lyonsweir Gallery, Chicago, IL
2000 	  Taramind: 40 Years (retrospective), University of New Mexico Art Museum Albuquerque, NM
2000 	  Out of Line: Drawings by Illinois Artists, Chicago Cultural Center Chicago, IL
2000 	  Exquisite Corpse Exhibition, Printworks Gallery Chicago, IL
2000 	  Clark Gallery Lincoln, MA
1999 	  A Good Eye: Artists at the Ballpark, Seafirst Gallery Seattle, WA
1996 	  Banco Central Cuenca, Ecuador
1995 	  Horwitch LewAllen Gallery Santa Fe, NM

References

External links 
Michael Nakoneczny Biography
Michael Nakoneczny in the UAF
Michael Nakoneczny show
Michael Nakoneczny paintings

1952 births
Artists from Alaska
People from Fairbanks, Alaska
Living people
University of Alaska Fairbanks faculty
American contemporary painters